Redwood, New Zealand may refer to:

Redwood, Canterbury, in Christchurch
Redwood, Wellington